
T'utura Qucha (Quechua t'utura totora, qucha lake, "totora lake",  hispanicized spellings Totora Khocha, Totora Kocha, Totora Qhocha, Totora Qocha, Totora Q'ocha) is a Bolivian lake located in the Cochabamba Department, Tiraque Province, Tiraque Municipality, Tiraque Canton, situated about 3,758 m high.

See also 
 Jatun Mayu
 Parqu Qucha
 Asiru Qucha
 Qullpa Qucha
 Wasa Mayu

References 

Lakes of Cochabamba Department